True Stories (full onscreen title: True Stories: A Film About a Bunch of People in Virgil Texas.) is a 1986 American satirical musical comedy film directed by David Byrne, who stars alongside John Goodman, Swoosie Kurtz, and Spalding Gray. The majority of the film's music is supplied by Talking Heads. A soundtrack album, titled Sounds from True Stories, featured songs by Byrne, Talking Heads, Terry Allen & The Panhandle Mystery Band, and others. Around the same time, Talking Heads released an album titled True Stories, composed of studio recordings of songs featured in the film.

True Stories was released by Warner Bros. in the United States, Canada, Italy, and Sweden in 1986, with limited release elsewhere the following year. Byrne was given much creative control over the motion picture's direction, largely due to the mainstream success of Talking Heads' 1984 concert film Stop Making Sense. The resulting film is replete with Byrne's eccentric and idiosyncratic observations of small-town life, exaggerated satirical imagery, and surrealist sense of humor.

Plot
The film is presented as a series of vignettes centered around Byrne as an unnamed, cowboy-hat-wearing stranger who visits the fictional Texas town of Virgil, where he observes the citizens as they prepare for the "Celebration of Specialness" to mark the 150th anniversary of Texas' independence. The event is being sponsored by the Varicorp Corporation, a local computer manufacturing plant.

Among the many characters the visitor meets and interacts with, the most prominent are:
 Louis Fyne (John Goodman), a country-western-singing clean room technician at Varicorp who is unlucky in love
 Civic leader Earl Culver (Spalding Gray), who never speaks directly to his wife, Kay (Annie McEnroe)
 Miss Rollings (Swoosie Kurtz), who never leaves her bed
 Mr. Tucker (Pops Staples), Miss Rollings' personal assistant, a kindly voodoo practitioner whom Louis hires to help him find love
 A conspiracy theorist preacher (John Ingle), whose shtick owes a great deal to the Church of the SubGenius
 Ramon (Tito Larriva), a Tejano singer who claims to hear tones from people
 "The Lying Woman" (Jo Harvey Allen), who recounts fantastic episodes from her life to anyone who will listen

Cast
 David Byrne as The Narrator (also as the Lip-Syncher with mustache during the "Wild Wild Life" sequence)
 John Goodman as Louis Fyne
 Spalding Gray as Earl Culver
 Annie McEnroe as Kay Culver
 Swoosie Kurtz as Miss Rollings, The Lazy Woman
 Pops Staples as Mr. Tucker
 John Ingle as The Preacher
 Tito Larriva as Ramon
 Jo Harvey Allen as The Lying Woman
 Chris Frantz, Tina Weymouth and Jerry Harrison as Lip-Synchers (Wild Wild Life sequence).

Production
Stephen Tobolowsky recounts in an episode of his podcast The Tobolowsky Files that he and his girlfriend Beth Henley met David Byrne and Talking Heads when Jonathan Demme invited them to a preview screening of Stop Making Sense. Shortly afterward, Byrne invited Henley and Tobolowsky over to his house and showed them a collection of hundreds of drawings he had made and put up on his wall. He explained they were based on clippings he had scrapbooked from tabloids as the band had been on tour. He had been intrigued by the idea of making a film based on the premise, "What if all these stories were true?" and wanted Henley and Tobolowsky to write the script based on those drawings.

Tobolowsky was aware that Texas was coming up on its sesquicentennial celebration, and thought that would provide a good framework for the characters Byrne had invented. Henley and he wrote a draft and provided it to Byrne, then did not hear back from him for about a year. It later turned out that Byrne had rewritten their script almost entirely, keeping only a few lines and the sesquicentennial framework from the first draft. However, he asked Tobolowsky and Henley for permission to list their names ahead of his as scriptwriters so the film would seem less like a "vanity project."

During Tobolowsky's early talks with Byrne, he related to Byrne the story of a series of psychic experiences he had during college, in which he had been able to hear "tones" that told him things about other people. Byrne incorporated this story into his rewrite, using it as the basis for Ramon's psychic powers and the song "Radio Head."

An early working title for the project (endorsed by bassist Tina Weymouth) was Wild Infancy. Filming took place in Dallas and its suburbs Allen, McKinney, Mesquite, Midlothian and Red Oak. The interior mall and fashion show scene was filmed in NorthPark Center in North Dallas, and the exterior mall scene was filmed at the now-demolished Big Town Mall in Mesquite. The parade scene at the end of the film includes various local groups, including the Tejas Low Riders Club and the Sunset High School Marching Band.

Reception
True Stories was not a commercial success at the time of its release. On Rotten Tomatoes, the film has an approval rating of 79%, based on 24 reviews, with an average rating of 6.6/10. Roger Ebert gave it a glowing review with a rating of 3.5/4 stars. It has achieved success in home video release as a cult classic among fans of Byrne's work.

Colin Greenland reviewed True Stories for White Dwarf #85, and stated that "True Stories is a tour of Virgil, Texas, Byrne's toytown utopia, whose peculiar citizens have neurosis down to a fine art. Zippy the Pinhead would be at home in Virgil."

Home media
In 1987, the film was released on VHS and Laserdisc. On March 30, 1999, it was released onto DVD. On November 27, 2018, The Criterion Collection released a DVD and Blu-ray of the film.

Music
True Stories features a number of songs written by Byrne and performed by various members of the cast as well as by Talking Heads (the members of which make cameo appearances).

Talking Heads released an album titled True Stories in which the band performs most of the songs from the film, including songs that were performed by the actors in the film. As such, the album is not generally considered a true soundtrack album, a fact Byrne points out in his liner notes on the release. Later, Byrne released an album containing primarily instrumental music from the soundtrack titled Sounds from True Stories.

While several of the cast performances were released as bonus tracks on 12-inch single releases, no full album of cast performances was released until 2018 (see below). Prior to 2018, few of the original versions of songs from the film found official release. The St. Thomas Aquinas School Choir's version of "Hey Now" was released on the 1987 Talking Heads UK CD single, "Radio Head"; the Pops Staples version of "Papa Legba" and Tito Larriva's version of "Radio Head" appear as extra tracks on the 2006 Rhino reissue of True Stories; and John Goodman's version of "People Like Us" was initially released as the B-side to the single for "Wild Wild Life" and later was released on the 2006 digital compilation Bonus Rarities and Outtakes, but the rest of the songs whose versions differ between the movie and album (John Ingle's "Puzzling Evidence" and Annie McEnroe's "Dream Operator") were not officially available. "Cocktail Desperado", recorded by Terry Allen and the Panhandle Mystery Band and featured in the film, is included on the Sounds from True Stories LP.

The music video version of "Wild Wild Life" that debuted on MTV is largely a scene taken from the film, in which many of the film's characters (including John Goodman) lip-synch to the music in a night club; the video version is more risque and features more pop music references/parodies than seen in the film; the Prince and Billy Idol parodies remain in the film version. Similarly, the video for "Love for Sale" is the same as that seen in the film (in which Kurtz's character is shown watching it on TV) except the video version has additional footage of Talking Heads, more references to recognizable TV commercials of the day, and no intercuts to any of the film characters.

In November 2018, True Stories, A Film by David Byrne: The Complete Soundtrack, a comprehensive soundtrack album with 23 songs as they were recorded for the film, was released. This marked the first time that the complete True Stories soundtrack was made publicly available, 32 years after the movie's original release. The soundtrack was issued to coincide with Criterion's 2018 DVD and Blu-ray release of the film, the latter of which it was also packaged with. The new-edition soundtrack includes the three Talking Heads performances with David Byrne on lead vocals that are featured in the movie, "Wild Wild Life," "Love for Sale," and "City of Dreams", which are the same recordings included on the Talking Heads album True Stories; otherwise, the material does not overlap with the Talking Heads album. The new edition includes the first official commercial release of McEnroe's "Dream Operator" and Ingle's "Puzzlin' Evidence".

Legacy
English rock band Radiohead is named after the song "Radio Head" from True Stories. 

In January 2017, Red Letter Media published a video in its Re:View series where regular panelists Jay Bauman and Josh "The Wizard" Davis had a retrospective discussion of the film. They focused on the eccentricity of the characters, the performance of Byrne as the film's narrator, the way the film extensively incorporates music, and the observations the film makes about American culture. Both hosts praised it, and Davis said of the film, "It never gets old for me, and I've shown it to so many people".

Virgil Texas, a podcaster known for formerly co-hosting the political podcasts Chapo Trap House and Bad Faith, based his pseudonym on the name of the film's setting.

References

External links

True Stories: Everybody Has Tones an essay by Rebecca Bengal at the Criterion Collection

1986 films
1980s musical films
1980s satirical films
American musical films
American rock music films
Films directed by David Byrne
Films set in Texas
Films shot in Texas
Films with screenplays by Beth Henley
Films with screenplays by David Byrne
Films with screenplays by Stephen Tobolowsky
Talking Heads
1986 directorial debut films
1980s English-language films
1980s American films